Donald Charles Hood (born 1942) is the James F. Bender Professor in Psychology and Professor of Ophthalmic Science in the Department of Psychology at Columbia University. He is a former editor-in-chief of Investigative Ophthalmology & Visual Science.

Hood was born in 1942 in Mineola, New York.

Hood earned his undergraduate degree from Binghamton University in 1965 and his Ph.D. from Brown University in 1969. He served as vice president for the Arts and Sciences at Columbia University from 1982 to 1987 and on Brown University's Board of Fellows from 2002 to 2012.

Honors and awards 

 Member, Society of Experimental Psychologists, 1992
 Honorary Sc.D., Smith College, 2000
 Fellow, American Academy of Arts and Sciences, 2013
 Doctor of Humane Letters, Brown University, 2017
 Honorary Sc.D., SUNY College of Optometry, 2019

External links

References 

1942 births
People from Mineola, New York
Fellows of the American Academy of Arts and Sciences
Binghamton University alumni
Brown University alumni
Columbia University faculty
Living people